The Virgin Valley Heritage Museum, originally known as the Desert Valley Museum, is in Mesquite, Nevada and is listed on the United States National Register of Historic Places.  The museum displays exhibits about area pioneers and local history.

History 
The building was designed by Walter Warren Hughes and built by the National Youth Administration in the Vernacular Pueblo Revival style.

Opened in 1940 as a library, it was converted around 1945 to a Southern Nevada Memorial Hospital branch.  From 1977 to 1984, the building was used by the Boy Scouts of America for meetings.

It opened as the Desert Valley Museum on May 23, 1985. In July 2001, the name was changed to the Virgin Valley Heritage Museum.

The site was listed as a building in the National Register of Historic Places on October 24, 1991.

Collection 
The collection includes artifacts from about 1875 to 1935.

References

External links

 – City of Mesquite

Museums in Clark County, Nevada
National Register of Historic Places in Clark County, Nevada
Buildings and structures in Mesquite, Nevada
History museums in Nevada
Pueblo Revival architecture
New Deal in Nevada
Buildings and structures on the National Register of Historic Places in Nevada
Museums on the National Register of Historic Places
National Youth Administration